Mark Howell is an American musician, composer, ethnomusicologist, and music archaeologist.

Early life and education
Howell was born in Philadelphia, Mississippi in 1952 and moved to New York City in 1982.  
In 1996 Howell earned an M.F.A. in music composition at SUNY Stony Brook; and in 2004 a Ph.D. in ethnomusicology from the CUNY Graduate Centerwith a dissertation called "An Ethnoarchaeological Investigation of Highland Guatemalan Maya Dance-Plays."

Career
In 1983 he formed an avant-garde post-rock band called Better Than Death (BTD) with bass clarinetist Michael Lytle. 
In 1986 he collaborated with Etron Fou saxophonist, Bruno Meillier to form a Euro-American group called Zero Pop.    They recorded, All the Big Mystics and  Glows in the Dark.  In between Zero Pop tours BTD recorded Swimman (1987), and followed that release with a U.S. tour. Between 1986 and 1994 Zero Pop toured Europe seven times and the United States three.

Howell played guitar on the Curlew record, North America, and met Martin Bisi, Rick Brown, Tom Cora, and Fred Frith.  In 1989 he and Frith, Nick Didkovsky, and Rene Lussier formed the Fred Frith Guitar Quartet.In 1989 Howell formed a third band, Timber, with drummer, Rick Brown and bass player, Faye Hunter who was later replaced by Jenny Wade.  Between 1989 and 1996 Timber made two U.S. tours and one in Europe.  They released one CD, Parts and Labor, were included on Matador's LP and CD New York Eye and Ear Control, as well as on two of Elliott Sharp's State of the Union compilation CDs.  Howell's involvement with the Fred Frith Guitar Quartet between 1989 and 1995, included five European tours, several U.S. performances and the recording of "The As Usual Dance Towards the Other Flight to What is Not," which was released on Frith's CD, Quartets.  He also played with Frith, Didkovsky, Lussier, and others, at the Brooklyn Academy of Music performance of, "In Memory," in 1989.

In addition to his band work, Howell has composed for Lynn Shapiro (at the American Dance Festival 1994), Amy Sue Rosen, Diane Torr, and Stephanie Artz.  He was also commissioned by several ensembles including "North By South," (1993) for percussionist Kevin Norton, and  "To the Heart," (1997) for the ten-piece mixed ensemble, New Ear.  His composition scores were published by Frog Peak Music.

Howell has researched the music of Precolumbian America.  He has presented papers and published books and journals on topics related to music archaeology.  In 2006 he became the director of the Winterville site, an archaeology park and museum in the Mississippi Delta.

Howell is a member of the duo called Inconvenient Music.

Select Discography
Inconvenient Music, MP3 downloads. Myspace.com/Inconvenient Music (2007).
State of the Union (Elliott Sharp compilation, with Timber), CD. EMF (2001).
Quartets (with the Fred Frith Guitar Quartet), CD. Rec Rec Zurich (1994).
Parts and Labor (Timber), CD and LP. joint distribution by Rift and Rough Trade London (1992).
New York Eye and Ear Control (compilation, with Timber), CD and LP. Matador (1991).
Glows in the Dark (Zero Pop), CD. Rec Rec Zurich (1987).
All the Big Mystics (Zero Pop), LP. Rec Rec Zurich (1987).
Swimman (Better Than Death), LP. Lost/Twin Tone (1987).
North America (Curlew), LP. Moers (1986); reissue as CD, Cuneiform (2002).

Select Publications
“Origin and Meaning of the Hopewell Panpipe.” In Flower World: Archaeology of the Americas. Mundo Florido Arqueomusicología de las Américas, I. Eds., Matthias Stöckli, Mark Howell and Arnd Adje Both. Ēkhō Verlag, Berlin (to be published in 2014).

“Music Evidence of Spanish, French, and English Encounters with Native Americans: The Similarities, Differences, and Consequences.” In Sound, Political Space and Political Condition: Exploring Soundscapes of Societies Under Change. Topoi—Excellence Cluster Publication. Eds., Ricardo Eichmann, Mark Howell, and Graeme Lawson, Berlin (to be published in 2013).

“The Concise ISGMA Handbook of Music Archaeological Practice.” Eds., Mark Howell, Graeme Lawson, and Stefan Hagel (to be on-line in 2013).

“An Organology of the Americas as Painted by John White and Other Artists.” In Flower World: Archaeology of the Americas. Mundo Florido Arqueomusicología de las Américas, I. Eds., Matthias Stöckli and Arnd Adje Both. Ēkhō Verlag, Berlin (2013), 155-168.

“Tzunam Bailes and the Role of Music Instruments in Precolumbian Highland Guatemala.” In Orient Archäologie Band 27 Studien zum Musikarchäologie VIII . Eds., Ricardo Eichmann, Fang Jianjun, and Lars-Christian Koch. Berlin (2013), 281-289. 
“Sonic-Iconic Examination of Adorno Rattles from the Mississippian-Era Lake George Site.”  Music and Art 36 (2011:1-2), 231-244.

“A Hermeneutic Re-examination of Select Commentaries on Aztec Music.” In Orient Archäologie Band 25 Studien zum Musikarchäologie VII.  Eds., Ellen Hickmann, Arnd Adje Both, Ricardo Eichmann, and Lars-Christian Koch. Berlin (2010), 213-225.

“Music Syncretism in the Postclassic K’iche’ Warrior Dance and the Colonial Period 	Baile de los Moros y Cristianos.” In Maya Worldviews at Conquest.  Eds. Leslie G. Cecil and 	Timothy W. Pugh. University Press of Colorado, Boulder (2009), 279-297.

“Las transcripciones musicales del Baile Drama del Rabinal Achi.” Ethnomusicología en 	Guatemala, 66:165-167.
“Concerning the Origin and Dissemination of the Mesoamerican Slit-Drum” Music and Art 28 (2003:1-2), 45-54.
Enchanted Music. Alley Tracts, a Division of Autonomedia (2001).

“Locronots: An Automatic Drawing Technique.” in The Improvisor (1989).

References

External links
http://www.frogpeak.org/fpartists/fphowell.html
http://www.myspace.com/nanihwaya

1952 births
Living people
Stony Brook University alumni
American male composers
21st-century American composers
American musicologists
21st-century American male musicians